Phoebe Carrai (born October 15, 1955 in Boston) is an American cellist.

Carrai studied at the New England Conservatory of Music in Boston where she earned both her Bachelor and Master of Music degrees. In 1979, Carrai undertook post-graduate studies in Historical Performance Practice with Nikolaus Harnoncourt at the Mozarteum in Salzburg, Austria.

In 1983, Phoebe Carrai joined the chamber music ensemble Musica Antiqua Köln. She worked with them for the next ten years and during that time taught at the Hilversum Conservatory in the Netherlands.

She now lives in the United States. She performs with the Arcadian Academy and the Philharmonia Baroque Orchestra (Nicholas McGegan); Ensemble Arion (Claire Guimond), Les Musiciens de Louvre (Marc Minkowski) and the Handel and Haydn Society (Grant Llewellyn). She has also performed with the Musica Angelica Baroque Orchestra.

Teaching 
Phoebe Carrai is a member of the faculties of the University of the Arts in Berlin, Germany and the Longy School of Music of Bard College in Cambridge, Massachusetts. She is also a founding member and co-director of the International Baroque Institute at Longy School of Music. Since 2009 she has been on the faculty of the Juilliard School in New York where her teaching includes Baroque Cello and Baroque Chamber Music.

Phoebe Carrai performs on an anonymous Italian cello from 1690 and has recorded for Aetma, Deutsche Grammophon, Harmonia Mundi, Telarc, Decca and BMG.

References

Living people
1955 births
Musicians from Boston
American classical cellists
American music educators
American women music educators
New England Conservatory alumni
Longy School of Music of Bard College faculty
American women classical cellists
Juilliard School faculty
Classical musicians from Massachusetts
American women academics
21st-century American women